Francis Apelete Amuzu (born 23 August 1999) is a professional footballer who plays as a winger for the club RSC Anderlecht. Born in Ghana, Amuzu represents Belgium internationally.

Professional career
Born in Ghana, Amuzu moved to Belgium at an early age and developed as a footballer there. He signed his first professional contract on 23 August 2015 with R.S.C. Anderlecht for 3 years. He made his professional debut for Anderlecht in a 1–0 Belgian First Division A win over K.A.S. Eupen on 22 December 2017, scoring his side's game-winning goal on his debut. He pledged his international football to Belgium national team.

Career statistics

—

References

External links
 
 
 Anderlecht profile
 UEFA youth league profile
 Sport.de Profile

1999 births
Living people
Footballers from Accra
Belgian footballers
Belgium youth international footballers
Ghanaian footballers
Ghanaian emigrants to Belgium
R.S.C. Anderlecht players
Belgian Pro League players
Association football forwards
Black Belgian sportspeople